Kendal is a city and the regency seat of Kendal Regency, Central Java province, Indonesia. Its population is 54,109.

Climate
Kendal has a tropical monsoon climate (Am) with moderate rainfall from June to October and heavy to very heavy rainfall from November to May.

References

Regency seats of Central Java